Shoot Boxing – S-Cup 1996 was a shoot boxing event promoted by Caesar Takeshi.  It was a qualifier for the Shoot Boxing World Tournament 1997, featuring four elimination fights with all bouts fought under Shoot Boxing Rules (70kg/154lbs weight class) involving eight fighters from across the world.  The eight finalists were a mixture of invitees or had been involved in the 1995 tournament (for more information on these finalists, see the bulleted list below).

As well as competition bouts there were also five 'Super Fights', three fought under Shoot Boxing Rules (various weight classes), two fought under MMA Rules, and a 'Special Fight' fought under Kyokushin Karate Rules (75kg/165lbs weight class).  In total there were twenty fighters at the event, representing eleven countries.

The four elimination fight winners would qualify for the semi final stage of the Shoot Boxing World Tournament 1997 - to be held the following year.  Defeated elimination fighter Dany Bill would also be invited to take part in a 'Super Fight' against up and coming shoot boxer Kenichi Ogata.  The event was held at the Yoyogi National Gymnasium in Tokyo, Japan on Sunday, 14 July 1996.

S-Cup 1997 Finalists
 Dany Bill - Invitee, WMTC World Champion
 Hassan Kassrioui - Invitee
 Taro Minato - Invitee, MAJKF Champion
 Mohamed Ouali - WPKL World Champion
 Rainbow Sor.Prantalay - Invitee, WMTC World Champion
 Roni Lewis - S Cup 95 Runner Up
 Rayen Simson - S Cup 95 Quarter Finalist, WPKL European Champion
 Hiromu Yoshitaka - S Cup 95 Champion

Results

References

Shoot boxing events
1996 in kickboxing
Kickboxing in Japan
Sports competitions in Tokyo